Pharr-San Juan-Alamo North Early College High School is a public school in Pharr, Texas (United States). It is part of the Pharr-San Juan-Alamo Independent School District and is one of the district's six high schools.

Located at 500 E. Nolana Loop, the school serves students in grades nine through twelve.

Student demographics
As of the 2005–2006 school year, PSJA North had a total of 2,209 students (98.2% Hispanic, 1.4% White, 0.3% African American, and less than 0.1% Asian/Pacific Islander). 86.6% of the students are considered economically disadvantaged.

Attendance area and feeder patterns
The school's attendance boundary includes most of Pharr and sections of McAllen.

Feeder elementary schools include Arnold, Ford, Kelly-Pharr, Dr. Long, Longoria, Palmer, and Ramirez. Feeder middle schools include Lyndon B. Johnson and Liberty.

National recognition
PSJA North High School was one of the three recipients of the College Board's Inspiration Award in 2011. Former principal Narciso Garcia, several teachers, and two seniors represented the school at the College Board's annual forum in New York City in October 2011. The two seniors delivered speeches in front of over 2,000 educators from across the nation.

2007-08 accountability rating
Based on the accountability ratings released by the Texas Education Agency on August 1, 2008, PSJA North is currently rated "Academically Acceptable".

See also
Pharr-San Juan-Alamo High School
Pharr-San Juan-Alamo Memorial High School

Notable alumni
Roger Huerta, MMA fighter, who fought in the UFC and Bellator.

References

External links
 
 Pharr-San Juan-Alamo ISD

Pharr-San Juan-Alamo Independent School District high schools
Pharr, Texas